Autodrom Most is a hard-surfaced  long race track for motorsport outside of the city of Most in the northwest of the Czech Republic. The racing circuit was built between 1978 and 1983, but the Most district was known for organizing motorcycle and car races earlier. Autodrome is used for races of cars, trucks, motorcycles and free circuit rides, but also for test rides of developed cars, training of drivers of fire engines, ambulance and police cars, as well as training of drivers in crisis situations, etc.

In April 2021, the Most round was announced as being added into the Superbike World Championship series with a five-year agreement.

In August 2021, Autodrom Most was announced as one of the replacement circuits for the WTCR in the 2021 season; and in November 2021, it was announced that Autodrom Most would be permanently included in the 2022 race calendar. But on 19 March 2022, it was announced that Czech round was cancelled due to the state of emergency and logistical issues.

Events

 Current
 April: Carbonia Cup
 June: Sidecar World Championship, IDM Superbike Championship, 6h Le Most
 July: Superbike World Championship Supersport World Championship, Supersport 300 World Championship, Carbonia Cup
 August: FIA European Truck Racing Championship Czech Truck Prix, NASCAR Whelen Euro Series NASCAR GP Czechia - Autodrom Most NASCAR Show, TCR Eastern Europe Trophy, ACCR Formula 4 Championship
 September: Porsche Sprint Challenge Central Europe, 6h Le Most
 October: Histo-Cup Austria Histo Cup Finale, Carbonia Cup

 Former
 ADAC GT Masters (2018–2019)
 ADAC TCR Germany Touring Car Championship (2018–2019)
 Cup of Peace and Friendship (1984–1986, 1988–1989)
 EuroBOSS Series (2002)
 European Touring Car Cup (2017)
 FIM Endurance World Championship 6 Hours of Most (2021)
 FIM Superbike European Championship (1990–1991, 1994–1996)
 Formula Renault NEC (2009–2014)
 IMSA European Le Mans Series (2001)
 MAXX Formula (2020–2021)
 Porsche Carrera Cup Germany (2019)
 World Touring Car Cup FIA WTCR Race of the Czech Republic (2021)

Lap records 

The fastest official race lap records at the Autodrom Most are listed as:

Gallery

References

External links 

  
 Most at racingcircuits.info

Autodrom Most
Autodrom Most
Autodrom Most
Autodrom Most
Autodrom Most
Autodrom Most
Autodrom Most
Autodrom Most